Hotel Erotica Cabo is a 2004 late-night Cinemax softcore television series which first aired in 2006 and was directed by Gary Dean Orona and starring actresses Kimberly Fisher and Divini Rae.

Plot line
The episodes of this anthology series center around Corrine and Amanda, two young women who are the managers at a beautiful resort named Hotel Cabo located in Cabo San Lucas, Mexico.  Hotel guests have romantic experiences and fantasies with lovers, strangers, and sometimes with Corrine or Amanda.

The series was referenced in the CMT hit reality game show Sweet Home Alabama, after contestant Michael Dean appeared on the series. Dean was eliminated during that episode.

Episode list
 "Addicted to Love" – January 6, 2006
 "Mighty Mike Returns" – January 13, 2006
 "The Amazing Woody" – January 20, 2006
 "Last Tango in Cabo" – January 27, 2006
 "Primal Urge" – February 3, 2006
 "Wild Cards" – February 10, 2006
 "Chocolate Covered Cherries" – February 17, 2006
 "Skin Deep" – February 24, 2006
 "Stolen Kisses" – March 3, 2006
 "Summer Lovers" – March 10, 2006
 "Whole Lotto Love" – March 17, 2006
 "El Fiero" – March 24, 2006
 "Eyes Wide Open" – March 31, 2006

References

External links 
 

2006 American television series debuts
2006 American television series endings
2000s American romance television series
Hotels in fiction
Baja California
Cinemax original programming
Television series by Warner Bros. Television Studios
Erotic television series